Hatay is a large quarter (or a zone; semt) of the city of İzmir, Turkey. Administratively, Hatay forms part of the metropolitan district of Konak, İzmir's historic center along the southern shores of the tip of the Gulf of İzmir, and the largest and the most central of the nine districts that constitute the metropolitan area today.

Hatay roughly corresponds to the hillside area of İzmir reached after a steep climb behind the city's central square of Konak (Konak Meydanı) and commands this square and the quarter of Alsancak to the east, as well as the coastal strait that increasingly narrows towards the west. Along this narrowing coastline are such quarters as Karataş, İzmir's traditional Jewish neighborhood, and Göztepe. Hatay adjoins İzmir's Balçova metropolitan district in its western end, and Buca and Gaziemir in its south.

Traditionally, Hatay zone corresponded to the core of Turkish İzmir and was called "Mısırlı" in Ottoman times.

See also
 Konak
 Karataş
 Göztepe

Neighbourhoods of İzmir
Konak District